Schwichtenberg is a German language surname. Notable people with the name include:
 Ingo Schwichtenberg (1965–1995), German drummer and one of the founding members of the power metal band Helloween
 Helmut Schwichtenberg (born 1942), German mathematical logician
 Martel Schwichtenberg (1896–1945), German painter
 Wilbur Schwichtenberg (1912–1989), American trombonist and bandleader during the 1930s

References 

German toponymic surnames

German-language surnames